Matthew Corrente (born March 17, 1988) is a Canadian former professional ice hockey defenseman who last played in the National Hockey League (NHL) with the New Jersey Devils. Corrente was born in Mississauga, Ontario, but grew up in Etobicoke, Ontario.

Playing career
In 2004, he was drafted into the Ontario Hockey League (OHL) by the Saginaw Spirit, 2nd overall. During the 2006–07 OHL season, he was traded to the Mississauga IceDogs. He was drafted 30th overall in the 2006 NHL Entry Draft by the New Jersey Devils. In 2007 the 2007 Future Watch published by The Hockey News ranked Corrente as the top defenceman in the New Jersey Devils system at the time, and third overall after forward Nicklas Bergfors and goalie Jeff Frazee.

Corrente was called up to the New Jersey Devils on October 14, 2010.

On July 10, 2013, Corrente left the Devils organization as a free agent and signed a one-year two-way contract with the Carolina Hurricanes. In the 2013–14 season, Corrente was assigned to AHL affiliate, the  Charlotte Checkers. He featured in a career high 72 games posting 2 goals and 11 points as the Checkers failed to make the playoffs.

On July 5, 2014, Corrente signed a one-year, two-way contract as a free agent with the Tampa Bay Lightning. During the 2014–15 season, on March 2, 2015, Corrente was loaned by the Lightning to the San Antonio Rampage. In return, the Syracuse Crunch received Ryan Martindale from the Florida Panthers.

As an un-signed free agent over the following summers, Corrente accepted a try-out contract to attend the Grand Rapids Griffins training camp and pre-season on September 28, 2015. Corrente failed to feature in a regular season game with the Griffins before he was released from his try-out on October 17, 2015. 

Corrente now runs a hockey development school called Next pro Hockey, which develops ice hockey players with aspirations to play hockey in the NHL.

Personal
Corrente's brother David played for the Western Mustangs Men's Hockey team in the OUA.

Career statistics

Regular season and playoffs

International

References

External links

 Matt Corrente's profile on Hockey's Future

1988 births
Living people
Canadian people of Italian descent
Albany Devils players
Canadian ice hockey defencemen
Charlotte Checkers (2010–) players
Florida Everblades players
Lowell Devils players
Mississauga IceDogs players
National Hockey League first-round draft picks
New Jersey Devils draft picks
New Jersey Devils players
Niagara IceDogs players
Saginaw Spirit players
San Antonio Rampage players
Sportspeople from Etobicoke
Ice hockey people from Toronto
Sportspeople from Mississauga
Syracuse Crunch players